Thantub Suksumrarn (born 18 May 2001) is a Thai tennis player.

Suksumrarn has a career high ATP singles ranking of 1204, achieved on 27 June 2022. He also has a career high ATP doubles ranking of 879, achieved on 27 June 2022. 

Suksumrarn has won two ITF doubles titles.

Suksumrarn represents Thailand at the Davis Cup, where he has a W/L record of 1–0.

References

External links

2001 births
Living people
Thantub Suksumrarn
Thantub Suksumrarn